Tougbo is a town in northeastern Ivory Coast. It is a sub-prefecture of Téhini Department in Bounkani Region, Zanzan District.

Tougbo was a commune until March 2012, when it became one of 1126 communes nationwide that were abolished.

In 2014, the population of the sub-prefecture of Tougbo was 14,693.

The settlement is home to a large refugee population displaced by the Jihadist insurgency in Burkina Faso.

Villages
The thirty four villages of the sub-prefecture of Tougbo and their population in 2014 are:

Notes

Sub-prefectures of Bounkani
Former communes of Ivory Coast